Crystal Waters (born November 19, 1961) is an American house and dance music singer and songwriter, best known for her 1990s dance hits "Gypsy Woman", "100% Pure Love", and 2007's "Destination Calabria" with Alex Gaudino. All three of her studio albums produced a Top 40 hit on the Billboard Hot 100. In December 2016, Billboard magazine ranked her as one of the most successful dance artists of all time. Her accolades include six ASCAP Songwriter awards, three American Music Award nominations, an MTV Video Music Award nod, four Billboard Music Awards and twelve No. 1 Billboard Dance Chart hits. Her hit song "Gypsy Woman” has been sampled hundreds of times. Though her music sales have yet to be re-certified, Waters has sold over 7 million records worldwide.

Life and career

Early life
Born in Deptford Township, New Jersey, Waters is the daughter of Junior Waters, a famed jazz musician, and his wife Betty. Her great-aunt, Ethel Waters, was one of the first black American vocalists to appear in mainstream Hollywood musicals. Her family moved to New Jersey for a while but they again moved to Washington, D.C. At age eleven she began writing poetry and took her writing seriously enough to be inducted into the Poetry Society of America when she was 14, the youngest person ever to receive that honor.

She studied business and computer science at Howard University, but her creative work as a musician dropped off as she found less time for it. After earning her college degree in 1989, Waters secured a job as a probation officer with the Washington, D.C. parole board, making a living that would support her two daughters. One of her daughters, Ella Nicole, is a singer-songwriter who was discovered in 2014 and managed by Samonee K.

Music career

Waters' first job in the music world was as a backup singer at a local recording studio. She realized she wanted the creative control of writing her own music. Meeting the Basement Boys at a D.C. conference, they agreed to collaborate. Waters' self-described style was jazz and the Basement Boys was house. The first two songs she wrote for the 'Boys were "Makin' Happy" and "Gypsy Woman".

Waters signed a writing contract with Mercury Records in 1989.

Her single "Makin' Happy", with contributions by remixer Steve "Silk" Hurley, shot quickly to No. 1 on the Billboard Dance Club Songs.

With her 1994 follow-up album, Storyteller, Waters made a mainstream comeback with her hit single "100% Pure Love", which hit number 11 on the Billboard Hot 100, No. 1 on the Billboard Dance Club Songs, and became one of the longest-charting singles on the Hot 100 at 45 weeks ("Gypsy Woman" had remained on the chart for 16 weeks). Along with the single, her second album Storyteller, sold over one million copies in the United States. Feminist scholar and social activist bell hooks described Waters as "fierce and politically on the job" because of the singer's socially conscious lyrics.

In 1996, Waters participated in the AIDS benefit album Red Hot + Rio, which was produced by the Red Hot Organization, performing the song "The Boy from Ipanema".

In 2007, the mega European hit "Destination Calabria" by Alex Gaudino, featuring vocals by Crystal Waters, went to No. 1 on the European Pop Chart in over 30 countries. The track is a mashup, taking the instrumental from Rune's "Calabria" and the vocals from Alex Gaudino's and Crystal Waters' "Destination Unknown", both originally released in 2003. It was produced with the help of Maurizio Nari and Ronnie Milani (Nari & Milani), matching the saxophone hook/riff from "Calabria" to Crystal Waters' voice. "Destination Calabria" was released as a 12-inch single by the Italian label Rise Records, and as a CD single on March 19, 2007 by British label Data Records. It originally charted in Australia in February 2004, peaking at No. 98 under the title "Destination Unknown" before being re-released as "Destination Calabria" and reaching No. 2 in 2007.

In 2012, "Le Bump" with Yolanda Be Cool gave Waters another No. 1 on the Beatport House Chart.

With DJ Chris Cox in 2013, the No. 1 Billboard Dance Club Songs hit "Mama Hey", was listed as one of Billboard "Top 50 Dance Songs of 2013".

In November 2015, Waters released "Synergy", and in October 2016 she released "Believe". Both songs quickly rose to the No. 1 spot on the Billboard Dance Club Songs.

Her 2017 single "Testify" with Hifi Sean was released on Defected Records and went straight to the A-List on BBC Radio and garnered another No. 1 spot on the Billboard Dance Club Songs.

Her third collaboration with Sted-E & Hybrid Heights, titled "I Am House", reached No. 1 in the club charts in Spring 2018, giving Waters a total of twelve No. 1 singles in the US Billboard Dance Club Songs.

In February 2020, she began a monthly radio/podcast show called "I Am House".

Discography

Studio albums

Compilation albums

Singles

Awards and nominations

See also

List of Billboard number-one dance club songs
List of artists who reached number one on the U.S. Dance Club Songs chart

References

External links
 

1961 births
Living people
20th-century African-American women singers
African-American women singer-songwriters
American contemporary R&B singers
American dance musicians
American women pop singers
American house musicians
American women in electronic music
Musicians from Philadelphia
People from Deptford Township, New Jersey
Singer-songwriters from New Jersey
Singer-songwriters from Pennsylvania
Mercury Records artists
AM PM Records artists
Howard University alumni
21st-century African-American women singers